Mill Creek is a stream in the U.S. states of Iowa and Missouri. It is a tributary of Nodaway River.

Mill Creek was so named on account of a watermill near its course.

See also
List of rivers of Iowa
List of rivers of Missouri

References

Rivers of Nodaway County, Missouri
Rivers of Page County, Iowa
Rivers of Iowa
Rivers of Missouri